The following is a list of the 55 municipalities (comuni) of the Metropolitan City of Bologna, Emilia-Romagna, Italy.

List

See also
List of municipalities of Italy

References

 01
Metropolitan City of Bologna
Bologna